Bunny Hall is a  grade I listed country house in Bunny, Nottinghamshire.

The house was originally an Elizabethan red brick house with an 80 foot high tower. It has been equipped with a cinema room and a leisure area equipped with gymnasium, steam and sauna rooms, a large indoor heated pool and separate Jacuzzi and spa area. There is also a large orangery, drawing room, library and a circular glazed frosted dome allowing light to illuminate the hallway and staircase.

The hall is listed Grade I on the National Heritage List for England. Several buildings and structures associated with the hall are listed Grade II; these include the stable block, an out building to the north, a barn dating from 1734, the carriage archway and barns, and the garden walls and garden outbuildings, and the gate piers and walls around the park.

A chest tomb near the hall and the sundial are also Grade II listed.

History
The manor of Bunny was acquired as a dowry by Richard Parkyns when he married Elizabeth Barlowe in the 1570s and it is believed he built the original hall. Successive generations of the Parkyns family were to live there until 1850. After the civil war the owner at the time, Thomas Parkyns, was elevated to the baronetage in recognition of the family's support for the throne. In 1720 the buildings were greatly renovated by Thomas Parkyn, 2nd Baronet. Further extensive re-modelling of the Hall was carried out between 1826 and 1835. In 1850 the Parkyns lineage failed and the estate was bequeathed to Mrs. Burt, the housekeeper who in turn left it to the Levinge family. He sold the whole estate to
Sir Albert Ball, the Mayor of Nottingham who quickly passed it on to the Cordeux′ family. During World War II the estate and hall were bought by Bertie Edwards whose son moved out and renovated the building.

It was bought in 2000 by the family of Chek Whyte and in 2009 was for sale at a price in excess of £3 million.

References

Grade I listed buildings in Nottinghamshire
Grade I listed houses
Country houses in Nottinghamshire
Houses completed in the 19th century
Rushcliffe